General Sir William Charles Giffard Heneker,  (22 August 1867 – 24 May 1939) was a Canadian soldier who served with the British Army in West Africa, India, and then later on the Western Front during the First World War. A notable military strategist and tactician, he became one of the most experienced and highly decorated Canadians in the British Empire, and one of only a handful of Canadians to reach the rank of full general.

Education
William Heneker was born in Sherbrooke, Quebec on 22 August 1867, the son of Richard William Heneker (1823–1912) and Elizabeth, daughter of Captain Edward Tuson R.N. He received his early education at Bishop's College School in Lennoxville, Quebec, and then later entered military life when he enrolled at the Royal Military College of Canada in Kingston, Ontario on 1 September 1884. Assigned student #168, he graduated from RMC on 28 June 1888 with the rank of sergeant and first class grades.

Military service
During the first several decades of RMC's existence it was common practice for the War Office in London to offer commissions in the British Army to the best Canadian graduates. Heneker accepted an Imperial commission with the 1st Battalion, Connaught Rangers as a second lieutenant on 5 September 1888. At the time the unit was serving in India and Heneker joined the regiment there. He was promoted to lieutenant 12 February 1890, and later received his promotion to captain on 10 March 1897. Soon after he was seconded to the Niger Coast Protectorate, and began the period of his career that would define his legacy.

Between 1897 and 1906, Heneker served in the West African theatre, and participated in a variety of campaigns ranging from peacetime military engagement, to counterinsurgency, to major combat operations.  He served in the 1899 Benin Territories Expedition as Intelligence and Survey Officer, and was Mentioned in Despatches for his services. Heneker commanded the Ulia and Ishan Expeditions (March–May 1901, mentioned in despatches), the Ibeku-Olokoro operations, Afikpo operations, and also commanded No.4 Column in the Anglo-Aro War (November 1901 to March 1902; mentioned in despatches). He became brevet major on 31 July 1901, for services during operations in Esan and Ulia country, and was appointed a Companion of the Distinguished Service Order (DSO) for services during the Anglo-Aro war. The following year he served as second-in-command of the Southern Nigeria Regiment, in Southern Nigeria, and also served with the Royal West African Frontier Force. Heneker also waged a notable campaign against Chief Adukukaiku of Iggara, for which he again received a Mention in Despatches. Heneker was promoted to brevet lieutenant colonel 21 August 1903, but received his substantive British Army rank of major on 16 February 1907. He was later awarded the Brevet of full colonel on 24 October 1907.

Heneker was eventually posted to Southern Africa where he was Deputy Assistant Adjutant and Quarter-master-General, Orange River Colony District from 21 April 1906 to 20 April 1910. He then served briefly in India and the North-West Frontier. As lieutenant colonel, he commanded the 2nd Battalion North Staffordshire Regiment at Peshawar, India 10 April 1912. He served as temporary brigade commander, 1st Peshawar Infantry Brigade in 1912, and then later briefly as temporary brigade commander, Rawalpindi Infantry Brigade from 1913 to 1914. He was finally appointed commander, 1st Infantry Brigade, Quetta, in October 1914. During this time Heneker continued to serve as one of the King's Aide-de-Camps, an appointment he received in October 1907 and held until June 1917. William Heneker was a resourceful and skilled soldier as well as an exceptional tactician.  For his military services in West Africa he was invested by King Edward VII on 18 December 1903 with the Distinguished Service Order.

Military thought
In 1907 Heneker published a book examining tactical innovation in small wars titled Bush Warfare. The first serious analysis of the characteristics of small wars since the 1896 publication of British Army Lieutenant Colonel Calwell's Small Wars, Heneker's own study became required reading and a resource for all commanders until new doctrinal publications appeared in the 1930s. In 2007, Canadian military historian Andrew Godefroy edited a new edition of Bush Warfare in honour of the centenary of its original publication.

First World War
Temporary Brigadier General William Heneker was assigned to active duty in Europe at the outbreak of the First World War. He commanded the 54th Infantry Brigade, British Expeditionary Force from 13 March to 14 December 1915. During this period, he was severely wounded, but managed to recover well enough from his injuries to return to front line service. Heneker received his substantial promotion to colonel on 10 April 1916, though he retained his temporary appointment as brigadier. Anxious to return to command, he was appointed to lead the 190th Infantry Brigade, Royal Naval Division, in France from 29 October to 8 December 1916.

Heneker's next appointment was to the command of the 8th Infantry Division, which he led from 9 December 1916 until the end of the war. He was promoted to substantive major general on 3 June 1917, commensurate with his new responsibilities.

Despite a tenacious defence during the 1918 German spring offensive, Major General Heneker's division was overrun at the First Battle of Villers-Bretonneux. Fortunately Sir Thomas William Glasgow's 13th Brigade (Australia), and Harold Elliott's 15th Brigade (Australia), managed to recapture the location on 25 April 1918, and this feat of arms was later described by Lieutenant General Sir John Monash, commander of the Australian Corps, as the turning-point of the war. For his war service, Heneker was made a Commandeur of the Legion of Honour in 1918, and a Knight Commander of the Order of the Bath in 1919.

Post-war
Following the armistice on 11 November 1918, Heneker remained in service with the British Army during the occupation of the Rhineland. His division held a portion of the bridgehead east of Cologne, Germany from March to October 1919, after which he took command of a new formation, the Independent Division, Rhine Army, which he commanded from October 1919 to February 1920. Heneker commanded the Rhine Garrison at Cologne beginning in March 1920.

In 1921, Heneker served as commander of the Inter-Allied Commission of Management in Upper Silesia, stabilizing the borders between Germany and Poland. He was then made General Officer Commanding 3rd Division at Salisbury Plain until 1926. In 1928 he returned to India, where he was appointed Commander-in-Chief, Southern Command in India. He vacated his appointment as GOC-in-C on 22 March 1932, and was placed on half-pay from the following day before retiring from the Army on 16 April 1932.

Family
He married Clara Marion, daughter of E Jones, of Velindre, Wales, in 1901. The couple had two sons: David William, born 31 March 1906, and Patrick Allason Holden, born 1 September 1908. David Heneker was a composer and lyricist of Charlie Girl. He was nominated for three Tony Awards: in 1961, as one of the authors of the English book and lyrics for Best Musical nominee "Irma la Douce," and in 1965, as Best Composer and Lyricist and for music and lyrics of Best Musical nominee "Half a Sixpence." Patrick Allason Holden was a Captain in the 3rd Cavalry of the Indian Army; he died 29 August 1942 as a Prisoner of War on Singapore.

Footnotes

References
Andrew Godefroy (editor). Bush Warfare: The Early Writings of General Sir William C.G. Heneker KCB KCMG DSO. (Kingston, Ontario: Army Publishing Office for the Canadian Army Directorate of Land Concepts and Designs, 2008).

See also 
List of Bishop's College School alumni

|-

|-
 

Canadian Anglicans
British Army generals
Canadian knights
British Army generals of World War I
1867 births
Royal West African Frontier Force officers
Anglophone Quebec people
People from Sherbrooke
Connaught Rangers officers
North Staffordshire Regiment officers
Knights Commander of the Order of the Bath
Knights Commander of the Order of St Michael and St George
Bishop's University alumni
Commandeurs of the Légion d'honneur
1939 deaths
Royal Military College of Canada alumni
People from colonial Nigeria
Canadian expatriates in Nigeria
Bishop's College School alumni
Bishop's College School Faculty
Canadian military personnel from Quebec